Pretty Mary Sunshine was a band formed in Seattle, Washington in March 1993.

Almost as quickly as they were formed, they were signed to A&M Records.  Instead of unifying the five piece, being signed to a major record label hastened their disintegration.  "PMS" was contracted to produce two albums for A&M Records but they only "officially" released one.  What was intended to be their first album was recorded in Oklahoma City, Oklahoma by Record producer Keith Cleversley (one time producer of The Flaming Lips). 

The only song from the ill-fated "Oklahoma sessions" that A&M Records released, was "Can I Stay?" (featured in the cult movie soundtrack of S.F.W.). In an attempt to market Pretty Mary Sunshine as an indie-rock band, A&M Records also released two previously recorded tracks from the band's demo tape recorded at the Electric Eel Studio, in Seattle.

"Bird Medicine" - the full-length disc the band did manage to release was recorded at A&M Studio "C" in the Winter of 1994-1995.  The band was completely dissatisfied with the recording process in Hollywood, with tensions between Kurt & Patrice escalating as the producers steered the band into a sound neither liked. "Bird Medicine" was released with no marketing, support or promotion from A&M. The release date was held back for nearly a year due to attorney squabbles about credits in the liner notes. The band supported the release of this album solely to fulfill contractual obligations with a disastrous tour of the United States in 1995.

The band broke up in early 1996, after finally being dropped by their label after a debauched U.S. tour.

Kurt and Patrice went on to form Frownland with the original drummer, Pam Barger, Paul Hutzler (guitar, multi-instrumentalist and bass guitar player, Sean Wheatley, of Pretty Mary Sunshine.  Joe Howard, aka Joe Skyward, went on to join the Posies and Sunny Day Real Estate.  Jerry O'Neill went on to record some solo material and then seemingly dropped out of the music world entirely until passing away in 2015.

Members

Core members 
 Patrice Tullai (vocals) also known for Frownland and (alicedean) ... 
 Kurt Elzner (rhythm guitar) also known for Frownland, the Purdins, Mazzy Star and currently of Pet Knives

Oklahoma sessions other members 
 Jerry O'Neill aka Gerald Weymeth (lead guitar, tambura, and harmonium) also known for John the Baptist, the Purdins, Dolly Rocker (later went to Green Gel Records)
 Joe Howard aka Joe Skyward (bass guitar) also known for Sky Cries Mary, Sunny Day Real Estate and the Posies.
 Pam Barger (drums) also known for Two Nice Girls, the Billy Tipton Memorial Saxophone Quartet and Frownland.

Bird Medicine other members 
 Andy Harderson (lead guitar) also known for Faceless Chaos
 Sean Wheatley (bass guitar) also known for Frownland
 Mark Wilcox (drums) also known for Faceless Chaos, The Verge, and The Cringe.

Discography 
 1993 self-titled demo cassette (unknown formation)
 Madman
 Blue
 Charcoal To Diamond
 When I Fall
 Seven
 Oklahoma 1994 sessions
Only two songs were released ("Jessica" & "Can I Stay?") as a single under the label Spontaneous Underground, a pseudonym of A&M. "Can I Stay?" was also featured on the film and the soundtrack of the S.F.W. movie while Jessica later appeared on the 1995 LP.
 "Bird Medicine" 1995 LP (digitally rereleased in 2014)
 Jessica
 Queen If The Big Head Universe
 Carousel
 Reptile Girl
 Selfish
 Recycle
 Valerie
 Country Joe Bass Song
 Puerto Rican Rita
 Seven
 Get It Together
 Charcoal To Diamond

References

External links 
 Sad-Eyed Lady Of The Frownlands (album by Frownland, band featuring four ex members of Pretty Mary Sunshine plus guitarist and bassist Paul Hutzler) on bandcamp.com
Rock music groups from Washington (state)
Musical groups from Seattle